National Registry of Food Safety Professionals (NRFSP) is a food safety certification for the restaurant, hotel, and quick service industry business administered by Environmental Health Testing. NRFSP was founded in 1998 through partnerships between the Chartered Institute of Environmental Health and Professional Testing, Inc. and is headquartered in Orlando, Florida, United States.

NRFSP's International Certified Food Safety Manager is the first and only food manager safety certification to be accredited by the American National Standards Institute (ANSI) based on the ANSI/ISO/IEC 17024 standard for conformity - general requirement for bodies operating certification of persons.  NRFSP’s certification program has been developed to assess the knowledge of entry-level Food Safety Managers in the retail food industry.

The Food Safety Manager examination is acceptable in all states and jurisdictions that recognize those standards set by the Conference for Food Protection and is an assurance of quality in the development and maintenance of the exams. 

NRFSP runs the Food Safety blog.

The National Restaurant Association acquired the National Registry of Food Safety Professionals in 2016.

See also
Chartered Institute of Environmental Health (United Kingdom), Chartered Institute no longer owns Nation Registry of Food Safety Professionals. National Registry of Food Safety Professionals was bought by the National Restaurant Association as reported in Nations Restaurant News on February 10, 2016, by Brent Thorn.

References

External links

Environmental Health Testing

1998 establishments in the United States
Food industry trade groups
Food safety in the United States
Food safety organizations
Hospitality industry organizations
Trade associations based in the United States
Organizations based in Orlando, Florida
Organizations established in 1998